Ronald Bi Jen-hsu (born 4 December 1938), known by his stage name Chin Han, is a retired Hong Kong actor, director, screenwriter and producer born in mainland China. He has appeared in over 50 Mandarin-language films in Hong Kong and Taiwan, many of them produced by the Shaw Brothers Studio in the 1960s and the 1970s.

Personal life
Born in Weihai, Republic of China, Pi Jen-hsu moved to Hong Kong as a small child during the Japanese occupation of Hong Kong. After finishing from New Method College, his first career was in a hong. In 1961, he entered Shaw Brothers Studio, working as a script supervisor for director Yueh Feng. In 1964, he rose to fame when Yueh Feng cast him in a major Huangmei opera film Lady General Hua Mu-lan, opposite superstar Ivy Ling Po.

In 1966, Chin Han married Ivy Ling Po. They moved to Taiwan in 1973 where they continued to work in the film industry until immigrating to Canada in the late 1980s. After retirement, they made guest appearances in their son Kenneth Bi's directorial debut Rice Rhapsody (2004).

Filmography

Film
 As actor

 As director
 1965: Three Beautiful Blind Female Spies
 1966: Three Beautiful Blind Female Spies 2
 1966: Three Beautiful Blind Female Spies 3
 1966: The In-law Marriage
 1967: The Other Day's Typhoon
 1976: Crossroad – also actor, writer and producer
 1978: Dream of the Red Chamber – also writer (opera film)
 1980: The Imperious Princess – also co-producer (opera film)

 As writer
 1967: The Three Desperate Drunks
 1976: Crossroad – also actor, director and producer
 1978: Dream of the Red Chamber – also writer (opera film)

 As producer
 1976: Crossroad – also actor, director and writer
 1980: The Imperious Princess – also director (opera film)

Television series

References

External links

1938 births
Hong Kong male film actors
Hong Kong film directors
Living people
Writers from Weihai
Hong Kong male television actors
Hong Kong screenwriters
Hong Kong film producers
Hong Kong people of Shandong descent
20th-century Hong Kong male actors
21st-century Hong Kong male actors
Male actors from Shandong
Chinese male film actors
Chinese male television actors
20th-century Chinese male actors
21st-century Chinese male actors
Screenwriters from Shandong